Tetris Zone is a Tetris game for the Macintosh platform and was released as a Universal binary for Apple computers. A Windows version was later released. It was one of the first games that attempted to limit the effects of T-spins on the game, by eliminating the recognition of T-spins triples. However, singles and doubles that use the TST twist are still recognized. In 2014, the game support was discontinued and it can no longer be downloaded.
It is Alexey Pajitnov's favorite version of Tetris.

Gameplay

Gameplay was nearly identical in gameplay to other Tetris titles, but with a different soundtrack. The game offered four modes of play dubbed "Marathon" mode, "Challenge" mode, "Sprint" mode and "Master Mode".

Marathon
Marathon mode played as a more classic version of Tetris, where a point system along with number of lines cleared were kept as indicators of progress. The level of speed was chosen prior to starting the mode of gameplay. There were 15 levels total.

Discontinuation
On 2014, the game was discontinued without prior notice from the official website and replaced by Tetris.com, a simpler online version.

References

External links
Official website (defunct)

2007 video games
MacOS games
Puzzle video games
Tetris
Video games developed in the United States
Windows games